Kurt Walter Tong (born 1964) is an American diplomat and business consultant, and the former Consul General of the United States of America to Hong Kong and Macau. He joined The Asia Group LLC as a Partner in July 2019. He previously was Principal Deputy Assistant Secretary of the Department of State's Bureau of Economic and Business Affairs and replaced Clifford Hart in Hong Kong in August 2016. He arrived in Hong Kong on August 27, 2016, to assume his position as the Consul General.

Tong was the Senate-confirmed U.S. Ambassador for Asia-Pacific Economic Cooperation (APEC) when the United States hosted the forum in 2011.  He was the Deputy Chief of Mission for the United States Embassy in Tokyo, Japan from 2011 to 2014.  Earlier, he was Director for Korean Affairs at the U.S. Department of State, and Director for Asian Economic Affairs at the White House, and participated in the Six Party Talks with North Korea.  He also worked at the U.S. embassies in Seoul, Beijing, Tokyo and Manila.

Tong was born in Ohio and raised in Massachusetts. He graduated with an A.B. from the Woodrow Wilson School of Public and International Affairs at Princeton University in 1987. He has also studied at the Beijing Institute of Education, Inter-University Program for Chinese Language Study in Taipei, Inter-University Center for Japanese Language Studies in Tokyo, and International Christian University in Tokyo. He is fluent in Mandarin and Japanese.

References 

Living people
American diplomats
Princeton School of Public and International Affairs alumni
International Christian University alumni
Consuls general of the United States in Hong Kong and Macau
1964 births